James Patrick Beene (born 1965) is a justice of the Arizona Supreme Court.

Early life and education
Beene is a graduate of the University of California at Santa Barbara, where he received a bachelor's degree in political science. He graduated from the University of Arizona College of Law in 1991.

Professional career 
After graduating law school, Beene worked as a prosecutor in the Maricopa County Attorney's Office. He also worked in the appellate section of the Arizona Attorney General's Office.

State judicial service 
He spent seven years as a judge of the Maricopa County Superior Court, and then was appointed to the Arizona Court of Appeals on December 9, 2016.

Appointment to Arizona Supreme Court 

On April 26, 2019, Governor Doug Ducey announced his appointment of Beene to be a justice of the Supreme Court of Arizona. He was appointed to the seat left vacant by the retirement of John Pelander. He was sworn in on June 3, 2019, by Arizona Secretary of State Katie Hobbs.

See also
 List of Hispanic/Latino American jurists

References

External links 
 Biography at Ballotpedia
 Vacancy Application. Archived from the original on April 26, 2019.

1965 births
Living people
Arizona state court judges
Justices of the Arizona Supreme Court
James E. Rogers College of Law alumni
Place of birth missing (living people)
University of California, Santa Barbara alumni
21st-century American judges
Arizona Republicans
Hispanic and Latino American judges